KUBQ (98.7 FM, "The Ranch") is a radio station licensed to serve La Grande, Oregon, in the United States of America.  The station is owned by the Pacific Empire Radio Corporation. KUBQ broadcasts a country music format to eastern Oregon.

All five stations owned and operated by Pacific Empire Radio Corporation, in Eastern Oregon, share a radio studio building in La Grande, Oregon, located at 2510 Cove Ave.

History
In November 1984, KLBM, Inc., reached an agreement to sell KLBM-FM to Grande Radio, Inc.  The deal was approved by the FCC on January 7, 1985, and the transaction was consummated on June 24, 1988.

The station was assigned the KUBQ call sign by the Federal Communications Commission on June 4, 1990.

On July 1, 2019, KUBQ changed their format from rock to country, branded as "98.7 The Ranch".

Previous logo

References

External links
KUBQ official website
Pacific Empire Radio Corporation

UBQ
La Grande, Oregon
Country radio stations in the United States
1977 establishments in Oregon